The Free Electric Band is an album by Albert Hammond released by Mums Records. The album landed on the Billboard 200 chart, reaching #193.

The title track single hit #48 on the Billboard Hot 100 and #19 on the UK Singles Chart in 1973.  The single "The Peacemaker" hit #51 on the Adult Contemporary chart and #80 on the Billboard Hot 100.

The album was produced and arranged by Hammond.

Track listing 
All tracks by Albert Hammond & Mike Hazlewood
 "Smokey Factory Blues"
 "The Peacemaker"	
 "Woman of the World"
 "Everything I Want to Do"
 "Who's for Lunch Today"
 "The Free Electric Band"
 "Rebecca"
 "The Day the British Army Lost the War"
 "For the Peace of All Mankind"
 "I Think I'll Go That Way"

Personnel
Albert Hammond - vocals, guitar
Jay Lewis, Larry Carlton - guitar
Joe Osborn - bass guitar
Jim Gordon - drums
Michael Omartian - keyboards
Carol Carmichael and Friends - backing vocals
The Sid Sharp Strings - strings

Chart positions
Album

Singles

References

1973 albums
Albert Hammond albums